Acteal is a small village in the municipality of Chenalhó, in the Mexican state of Chiapas, about 20 km north of San Cristóbal de las Casas. It became known internationally at the end of 1997 for the massacre of 45 indigenous people.

References

Populated places in Chiapas